Llanelltyd is a small village and community in Gwynedd, to the northwest of Dolgellau. The community population taken at the 2011 Census was 514, 57.4% of which speak Welsh.

It is home to the 12th-century Cymer Abbey, a grade I listed building. St Illtyd's church, one of the oldest parish churches in Wales, is a grade II* listed building.

The small settlement of Bontddu is in the community. The village itself has a population of around 300.

Notable people born in Llanelltyd
 , textile scientist
 William Owen, Wisconsin State Assemblyman

References

External links 

 
Villages in Gwynedd
Communities in Gwynedd